Nakanai is spoken by the Nakanai tribe in West New Britain, a province of Papua New Guinea.  It is an Austronesian language, belonging to the Malayo-Polynesian subgroup. Otherwise known as Nakonai, it also has dialects in the form of Losa, Bileki, Vere, Ubae, and Maututu.

Those were derogatory words, and in Nakanai mean 'to screw up the nose in distaste', and 'humming sound made by masked men', respectively.

History
Due to links between Nakanai and Eastern Oceanic languages, it is believed that its language family speakers arrived from the east of Papua New Guinea.

New Britain had experienced regular contact and settlement from 1840 to 1883, but the lack of coverage and useful records of the Nakanai region had the region deemed terra incognita.

Speakers
Nakanai is spoken by people living in the West New Britain Province of Papua New Guinea. They live in around 45 villages in the coastal and hinterland regions of Cape Hoskins, Commodore Bay, Cape Reilnitz, Bangula Bay and Cape Koas.
 
The dialects that make up the Nakanai language are Bileki, Ubae, Vele, Loso, and Maututu, respectively from the west-most to the east-most of the Nakanai-speaking areas.

Of all the dialects spoken, Bileki has the most native speakers due to being in a more densely populated area. It is common for speakers of other dialects to understand, or even speak, Bileki, but the reverse is not as common. There are 19 Bileki-speaking villages centered around Cape Hoskins and Commodore Bay. It also has a number of names, including Beleki and Central Nakanai. South-East of the Bileki area are the Ubae speakers, located in the Ubae and Gusi villages. Vele speakers are centered on the coastal and adjacent regions of Bangula Bay, in particular, the villages of Tarobi, Pasusu, Sisimi, Gaekeke, Kai and Kaiamo. Loso (or Auka) is a dialect of Nakanai spoken in the Silanga region, inland of Lasibu Anchorage. The villages are Kotoo Babata and Loa, all resettled at Silanga; Um, Bagela, Bibisi and Sipa, all resettled at or near Uasilau; and Movai, Sabol, Saiko, and a portion of Sipa, which are still situated on traditional land in the bush. The villages of the Maututu dialect are Matililiu, Gomu, Apulpul, Baikakea, Bubuu, Mataururu, Kiava and Evase, all grouped on the eastern coast of the Nakanai area, between Toiru River and Cape Koas. These are all United Church Villages and have been influenced therefore by Tolai-speaking missionaries and Nassa shell traders, plus contact with Melamela to the east, Bileki and Vele to the west, and the inland languages Longeinga, Wasi and Kol.

Grammar

Sociolinguistic choices
The noun article is obligatory when referring to an object, and when addressing an object, the noun article is never used.

Avoiding the use of names in speech is a way of showing esteem, whether one is talking about a person in reference or when addressing them. To use a person's name without good reason is seen as a form of disrespect. Instead, kinship terms are preferred. Esteem, in face–to–face conversations, is also displayed by referring to the addressee in the third person.

Syntax

Thematic roles

In terms of case relations, "Nakanai role structure operates morphologically as follows: there are six contrastive cases, Actor, which appears as the immediately pre-verbal NP; Patient, which appears in the unmarked instance as the immediately post-verbal NP; Source; which is the NP immediately preceded by the
post-verbal ablative particle le; Beneficiary, which is encoded by inalienable possession suffixation of the verb; Instrument, signaled by ablative particle le, but appearing discontinuously from it, the Patient-NP obligatorily intervening; and Goal encoded by the preposition te.
"Additionally, directional verbs in chained sequence such as tavu (towards) and taro (away from) 
encode goal and source relationship respectively. relationships of Direction, Range, Location and 
comitative are encoded by prepositionally-coreferential topic deletion."

Fundamental division of Nakanai cases in case relations:
Nuclear roles filling positions of referential prominence: actor, beneficiary, patient
Nuclear roles filling positions of non-referential prominence: goal, instrument, source
Peripheral roles (necessarily referentially non-prominent: location, direction, range, comitative

Actor
The actor is typically the animate entity credited for the action in a sentence. In Nakanai, the action includes the source, the undergoer and the experiencer of, "a caused or spontaneous process, or mental state or event." The actor noun phrase will precede the verb in the language.

Patient
The patient is affected by the action or state identified by the verb in a sentence. They receive this external action or exhibit a state identified by a verb.

In transitive clauses, the patient noun phrase is encoded by suffixation of the verb with a third-person singular affix -a. The accusative marking is optional for noun phrases with given information.

Japanese soldiers represent the new information.

The beneficiary or source noun phrases must precede the patient in a sentence, the two not being in the same sentence.

"The patient case appears in the nominal slot mmediately following the verb, and potentially preceded by accusative suffix -a on the verb. This is the statistically most frequent occurrence of Patient."

Beneficiary
These represent the animate beneficiary of the action or state identified by a verb. They are an inalienable possession marking agreeing with the beneficiary in number and person inclusiveness.

Occurs mostly in ditransitive clauses, where it must occur in the nominal slot immediately following the verb:

Instrument
For intransitive clauses they may represent: the inanimate force

the independent non-volitional cause, animate

inanimate

For transitive clauses, "[the] instrument is the case of the object accessory or tool involved in performing the action of the verb." They are always inanimate. With an actor, it appears as the last noun phrase in the clause, marked with post-verbal ablative particle . Without an actor, it may appear as the clause topic. "it is not a plausible analysis to regard  marking Instrument-NP as signalling Instrument outranked by another role (Patient), like English with, since this alternative does not explain the invariant ordering of the instrumental clause."

Sources
In ditransitive clauses, the source "represents the animate origin of an action in which a patient is moved away from source-entity by [an] actor"

source marked by ablative particle , appears post-verbally in first nominal slot."

Goal
Goals are encoded by the free particle . It is the case of the entity toward which the action is directed. It includes: destination, purpose, place, extent, or reason or topic of conversation. It is usually the last noun phrase in the clause.

Location

"Location may be optionally encoded by preposition  in addition to the coverb encoding Locative. Preposition  indicates that the embedded locative clause contains a nuclear case, viz. goal.

Depending on involvement of motion or whether the verb is transitive or not, there may be coreferential actor or patient deletion.

Coreferential topic deletion of actor noun phrase is not obligatory in the presence of motion verbs with the root  'to proceed'. "

Range
Range is encoded as the goal of the direction verb  'until/as far as', appearing as the main verb, or in a chained sequence with another verb. "It indicates a relationship of spatial extent or temporal duration:"

"This clause shows two instances of coreferential topic deletion in clauses in chained sequence. Note too that the preposition in this clause is optional."

Orthography

Nakanai has five vowels, and has the consonants .

Phonology

Nakanai syllables may be of the shape V or CV, with no codas or consonant clusters to be found anywhere in the language.

Phonology of the Nakanai language:

Phonological rules 

Younger Bileki speakers, typically younger than 30 years old, tend to drop the  sound from their speech. The Methodist parts of Nakanai also drop the  sound as a result of Kuanuan language influence.

Phonological differences 

The dialects of Nakanai mainly differ in the sounds that they use.

Bileki 
For the most popular dialect, Bileki, their s are s, s are s, s are s for a number of words, and s are s.

Bileki also shares phonological similarities with another language in the New Britain area, Melamela, which is located east of the Maututu-speaking regions. Phonological differences lie in the different rendition of certain phonemes.

Ubae 

In Ubae, the Bileki habit of dropping the  sound from their speech has caused the  noun marker to turn into l- for words starting with a vowel. For example:

Vele 

Like the Bileki dialect, the  sound has been dropped from Vele speech. Vele also has had contact with Bileki-speaking Methodist pastors, and thus the Methodist villages, Kaiamo and Sulu, speak a dialect that is moving closer to Bileki.

Loso/Auka 

Similar to Bileki, the  sound is missing. Similar to Vele, the noun marker  is simplified to just a.

Maututu 

Maututu's phonemic inventory shares a strong resemblance with Bileki's.

Vocabulary

Speakers exposed to English borrow English lexical items, as well as mix in words from Pidgin into their speech. The practice is frowned upon, despite being widely practiced.

Religion plays a part in the vocabulary used in the Nakanai-speaking regions. About 61.74% of speakers are Catholic, while the rest are Methodists of the United Church.
The Catholic areas keep older Nakanai words that were replaced in other parts. Methodist areas borrow words from the Kuanuan language.

There are distinct kinship terms and their use depends on whether the person is being referred to or being addressed.

Nakanai has, over time, experienced lexical innovation. One driving force behind lexical innovation in the language is to be able to "discuss matters without outsiders understanding key words." An example:

Lexical innovation also comes in the form of borrowing terms from the surrounding languages, mainly Tolai, Pidgin and English, to cover foreign objects. An example:

Before the borrowing of lexical terms, they would make do with creative reactions to new objects that arrived to New Britain from foreign sources.

Along with adding new terms, they have also expanded existing ones to match new experiences introduced by foreigners. 

There are also unnecessary borrowings in the forms of functional term and calques:

Ubae
Ubae, compared to its neighbor Vele, has numerous lexical differences from Bileki, taking from other Eastern Nakanai dialects. For example, consider the words : this means 'dog'.

Lexicon

Notes

References

 
 
 
 

Meso-Melanesian languages
Languages of West New Britain Province